Khrustalyov, My Car! is a 1998 Russian comedy-drama film directed by Aleksei German and written by German and Svetlana Karmalita. It was produced by Canal+, CNC, Goskino, Lenfilm and VGTRK.

Plot
On the first day of the cold spring of 1953 two events occur, not comparable in importance: fireman Fedya Aramyshev is arrested and "the greatest leader of all times and peoples" Joseph Stalin is found lying on the floor of his dacha.

Some time before these incidents, we see events from the life of military-medical service general Yuri Klensky. In the Soviet Union, the Doctors' plot, in which a group of predominantly Jewish doctors are accused of a plot to kill Stalin, is in full swing.  But Klensky, himself Jewish, cheers himself up with almost non-stop drunkenness, hopes that Soviet justice will not touch him. However, a number of events suggest that Klensky's hopes are futile, and that his arrest will soon follow. In an early scene, the general meets his own double in the hospital, and then there is a "foreigner" in his house bearing news about a relative who allegedly lives abroad. Klensky, suspecting that this is a provocation, throws the "foreigner" down the stairs, but a local snitch manages to report in time to the MGB senior about the doctor's contact with foreigners.

Klensky tries to escape, but ends up getting arrested. The general's family is evicted and is placed in a crowded communal apartment, and Klensky himself, after being detained, is left to the criminals who brutally beat and rape him. But then a miracle happens: the bloody general is driven directly from the cell to the country to a certain "high-ranking" patient, who the shocked Klensky learns to be the "Great Leader". Stalin's state is hopeless, he is dying while wheezing and agonizing, and Beria's voice full of triumph utters the first sentence of post-Stalinist Russia, "Khrustalyov, My Car!".

Klensky is immediately released, but he does not return to medicine.  Instead, the general "goes to the people". At the end of the film he is the commandant of a train.  Drinking happily, he balances a glass of port on his shaved head.

Cast

Yuri Tsurilo as general Yuri Georgievich Klensky
Nina Ruslanova as the general's wife
Mikhail Dementyev as the general's son
Jüri Järvet Jr. as a Finnish reporter 
Aleksandr Bashirov as Fedya Aramyshev
Ivan Matskevich as the general's lookalike
Paulina Myasnikova as the general's mother
Viktor Mikhaylov as the general's driver
Nijolė Narmontaite as Sonya
Olga Samoshina as a teacher in love
Genrietta Yanovskaya as the general's sister
Evgeniy Vazhenin as an officer in plainclothes
Aleksei Zharkov as the head of the Ministry of Internal Affairs of USSR
Aleksandr Lykov as a convict-driver
Yuriy Nifontov as Tolik
Konstantin Vorobyov as a guard at the general's clinic
Ali Misirov as Joseph Stalin
Mulid Makoev as Lavrentiy Beria

Uncredited appearances
Viktor Stepanov as Terenty Fomich
Vladimir Maschenko as chief of the GPU
Valery Filonov as KGB officer "Pobuzhinsky"
Nikolay Dick as inspector
Sergei Diachkov as cadet
Sergei Russkin as KGB officer
Sergey Lanbamin as Junior Lieutenant
Dmitri Prigov as general anesthesiologist in the clinic
Konstantin Khabensky as orchestra musician with Bengal lights
Mikhail Trukhin as Conductor
Gennady Chetverikov as underworld boss
Anatoly Shvedersky as general doctor in the clinic
Evgeny Filatov as general doctor in the clinic

Production
Production of Khrustalyov, My Car! took seven years for writer-director Aleksei German to finish. German was able to bring the film to completion through financial backing from France.

Reception
The film premiered at the 51st Cannes Film Festival on May 20, 1998 as part of the main competition for the Palme d'Or award.

Critical response
During the Cannes premiere of Khrustalyov, My Car!, numerous critics walked out of the screening in disapproval due to its obtuse narrative and lengthy "unfunny" scenes of visual satire. However, film director Martin Scorsese, the jury president for Cannes in 1998, considered it to be the best film in the festival that year. Jacques Mandelbaum of Le Monde also gave the film praise, writing that it is a "carnivalesque record of the Soviet era", and belongs to a category of cinema that "challenges all categories of taste". J.-M. Duran of the Lyon-based newspaper Le Progrès stated that the film is "incomprehensible, but bewitching", and compared its director Aleksei German to Italian filmmaker Federico Fellini.

Upon its re-release by Arrow Films in December 2018, the film was given renewed critical acclaim. British film critic Peter Bradshaw of The Guardian gave the film five out of five stars, describing it as "a surreal fantasia-epic and nihilist political satire of cynicism and violence". Tara Brady of The Irish Times gave it four out of five stars, stating that "People come and go without introduction or elucidation. All of them are in keeping with the Soviet auteur’s grim view of humanity."

Accolades
At the 1999 Russian Guild of Film Critics Awards the picture was awarded as Best Film and Aleksei German received the Best Director prize.

References

External links

1998 films
1998 drama films
Cultural depictions of Joseph Stalin
Films about Jews and Judaism
Films about the Soviet Union in the Stalin era
Films directed by Aleksei Yuryevich German
Films set in 1953
French black-and-white films
Lenfilm films
Russian black-and-white films
Russian-language European films
Films about Joseph Stalin